Martin Beaty (October 8, 1784 – June 17, 1856) was a United States Representative from Kentucky. He was born in Abingdon, Virginia. In his life, he worked as an iron furnace operator, a salt manufacturer, a rancher, and a farmer. Beaty was a slaveowner.

Beaty was a member of the Kentucky Senate 1824–1828 and 1832. He served as a Presidential Elector for Henry Clay and John Sergeant in 1832 and William Henry Harrison and Francis Granger in 1836. He was an unsuccessful candidate for election to the Twenty-first Congress in 1828, and to the Twenty-second Congress in 1830, but was elected as an Anti-Jacksonian to the Twenty-third Congress (March 4, 1833 – March 3, 1835). He was an unsuccessful candidate for reelection to the Twenty-fourth Congress in 1834. After leaving Congress, he was a member of the Kentucky House of Representatives, 1848. He died in 1856 in Belmont, Texas where he was buried in Belmont Cemetery.

References

1784 births
1856 deaths
Members of the Kentucky House of Representatives
Politicians from Abingdon, Virginia
National Republican Party members of the United States House of Representatives from Kentucky
19th-century American politicians